Field hockey at the 1988 Summer Olympics in Seoul took place from 18 September to 1 October 1988 at the Seongnam Stadium in Seongnam. Twenty teams (twelve for men and eight for women) competed in the tournament.

Men's tournament

Preliminary round

Group A

Group B

Medal round

Final standings

Women's tournament

Preliminary round

Group A

Group B

Medal round

Final standings

Medal summary

Medal table

Medalists

References

External links
 Official Olympic Report

 
1988 Summer Olympics events
Field hockey at the Summer Olympics
Summer Olympics
1988 Summer Olympics